Upland is a borough in Delaware County, Pennsylvania, United States. Upland is governed by an elected seven-member borough council. The population was 3,239 at the 2010 census, up from 2,974 at the 2000 census.

Geography
Upland is located in southern Delaware County at  (39.856762, -75.379429). It is bordered to the west by Chester Township, to the north by the boroughs of Brookhaven and Parkside, and to the northeast, east, and south by the city of Chester. Chester Creek, a southeast-flowing tributary of the Delaware River, forms the southern boundary of the borough.

History

The first European settlers in this area were from the Swedish colony of New Sweden. They arrived in the area in 1643 and built a permanent settlement at Tinicum Island. Although the name literally means "up land", it also reflects the Swedish province of Uppland.

The settlement of Upland was built around the point where Chester Creek flows into the Delaware River, which is part of the city of Chester (formerly also called "Upland"). The colonists had plantations devoted to the cultivation of tobacco for export to Sweden. Upland was reflected on the early map of New Sweden made by Peter Lindstrom in 1654.

During this period, three governments were competing for colonial supremacy in the mid-Atlantic coastal area: the Dutch, the Swedish and the English. The Swedish settlement was incorporated into Dutch New Netherland on September 15, 1655. In 1664, the English captured New Netherland from the Dutch. In 1676, the Duke of York's laws were promulgated as the rule of conduct on the Delaware River, and courts were established, one of which was the Upland.

By the mid-1800s, the Upland Mills were built along Chester Creek in Upland by the wealthy textile manufacturer John Price Crozer.  The mills produced clothing for the US Army and other customers.

The borough of Upland, as opposed to the historic town of Upland (which was later renamed Chester), was founded May 24, 1869.

The John P. Crozer II Mansion, George K. Crozer Mansion, Caleb Pusey House, Old Main of the Crozer Theological Seminary, and Pusey-Crozier Mill Historic District are listed on the National Register of Historic Places. The Pusey House is one of the oldest buildings in the United States, completed in 1696, and one of the only extant buildings known to have been visited by William Penn (in addition to the Merion Friends Meeting House).

Education
Residents in Upland are zoned to the Chester-Upland School District. Main Street Elementary School is the elementary school in Upland. Residents are also zoned to Smedley Middle School and Chester High School.

Demographics

As of Census 2010, the racial makeup of the borough was 51.3% White, 41.3% African American, 0.3% Native American, 0.8% Asian, 0.1% Native Hawaiian and Pacific Islander, 2.4% from other races, and 3.8% from two or more races. Hispanic or Latino of any race were 5.8% of the population .

As of the census of 2000, there were 2,977 people, 1,116 households, and 765 families residing in the borough. The population density was 4,439.0 people per square mile (1,715.6/km²). There were 1,216 housing units at an average density of 1,813.2 per square mile (700.7/km²). The racial makeup of the borough was 77.23% White, 19.68% African American, 0.30% Native American, 0.34% Asian, 0.81% from other races, and 1.65% from two or more races. Hispanic or Latino of any race were 2.08% of the population.

There were 1,116 households, out of which 33.3% had children under the age of 18 living with them, 42.7% were married couples living together, 20.4% had a female householder with no husband present, and 31.4% were non-families. 26.7% of all households were made up of individuals, and 12.3% had someone living alone who was 65 years of age or older. The average household size was 2.67 and the average family size was 3.28.

In the borough the population was spread out, with 28.7% under the age of 18, 8.3% from 18 to 24, 27.9% from 25 to 44, 20.2% from 45 to 64, and 14.9% who were 65 years of age or older. The median age was 35 years. For every 100 females there were 89.0 males. For every 100 females age 18 and over, there were 84.3 males.

The median income for a household in the borough was $28,869, and the median income for a family was $35,640. Males had a median income of $31,188 versus $26,723 for females. The per capita income for the borough was $15,391. About 20.1% of families and 25.1% of the population were below the poverty line, including 46.3% of those under age 18 and 6.9% of those age 65 or over.

Transportation

Interstate 95 is the main highway serving Upland. Portions of Interchange 6 are located within the borough.

Points of interest 

 Caleb Pusey House
 Crozer Arboretum
 Crozer Chester Medical Center
 Crozer Theological Seminary
 John P. Crozer II Mansion
 Upland Baptist Church

Notable people 
Clarence D. Bell - Pennsylvania State Senator
John Price Crozer, textile manufacturer and philanthropist
John K. Hagerty, Pennsylvania State Representative for Delaware County (1921-1922)
 Martin Luther King Jr. obtained his Bachelor of Divinity in 1951 from Crozer Theological Seminary. 
 Heather Lind, Actress. Boardwalk Empire, TURN

References

Other sources
 Jordan, John W. A History of Delaware County, Pennsylvania (Lewis Historical Publishing Company, New York.  1914)
 Ward, Christopher  L.  New Sweden on the Delaware  (Philadelphia: University of Pennsylvania Press, 1938)
 Armstrong, Edward; William H. Denny The Record of the Court at Upland, in Pennsylvania. 1676 to 1681 (Kessinger Pub Company. 2007)

External links

 Upland Borough official website

Populated places established in 1845
Boroughs in Delaware County, Pennsylvania
1845 establishments in Pennsylvania